Douglastown may refer to:

Canada
 Douglastown, Ontario, part of Fort Erie, Ontario
 Douglastown, New Brunswick, a neighborhood in Miramichi, New Brunswick

United Kingdom
 Douglastown, a hamlet in Angus, Scotland